Bathouse may refer to:
The misspelling of bathhouse, a location for public bathing
Bat house or bat box, a home for bats
Bathouse Recording Studio in Ontario, Canada